Helmets in cricket were developed in the 20th century.

History
There are recorded instances of cricketers using scarves and padded caps to protect themselves throughout cricket history.  Patsy Hendren was one of the first to use a self-designed protective hat in the 1930s.  Helmets were not in common use until the 1970s.  The first helmets were seen in World Series Cricket, with Dennis Amiss being the first player to consistently wear a helmet which was a customised motorcycle helmet. 

Mike Brearley was another player who wore his own design. Tony Greig was of the opinion that they would make cricket more dangerous by encouraging bowlers to bounce the batsmen. Graham Yallop of Australia was the first to wear a protective helmet to a test match on 17 March 1978, when playing against West Indies at Bridgetown. Later Dennis Amiss of England popularised it in Test cricket. 
Helmets began to be widely worn thereafter.

The last batsmen at the highest (Test match) level to never wear a helmet throughout his career was Viv Richards, who retired from the international game in 1991.

Modern day cricket helmets 

Modern day cricket helmets are made in compliance with the recent safety standards of the International Cricket Council (ICC) and have to conform to the British Standard BS7928:2013. 

Materials used for making cricket helmets are impact resistance materials like ABS Plastic, Fibreglass, carbon fibre, titanium, steel and high density foam etc. Main parts of a cricket helmets are grill (made with steel, titanium or carbon fibre), chin strap, inner foam material, outer impact resistant shell etc.

Legislation
As of 2017, the ICC has refused to pass laws requiring the wearing of helmets, rather leaving the decision to each test nation to decide for themselves. However, although it is not obligatory for a batsman to wear a helmet, should he chose to do so, the helmet must comply with specific safety requirements, a rule all the test playing nations have agreed to.

In first class cricket, as of 2016, England requires all batsmen, wicketkeepers and fielders closer than 8 yards from the wicket to wear helmets. This is mandatory even when facing medium-pace and spin bowling.  
New Zealand and India do not require batsmen to wear helmets.
Australia requires helmets to be worn by batsmen if facing fast or medium-paced bowling; wicketkeepers if keeping up to the stumps; and all fielders in positions within 7 metres of the batsman, with the exception of any fielding position behind square of the wicket on the off side.

Opposition from players
Many players refused to wear helmets, either believing that they obstructed their vision when batting, or, just as in the similar debate in ice hockey, feeling helmets were unmanly, a view held by many spectators. Englishman Dennis Amiss was the first player to wear a helmet in the modern game, during a World Series Cricket match, for which both the crowd and other players mocked him.  Australian captain Graham Yallop was booed when he wore one in a 1978 match against the West Indies (the first time a helmet was worn in a test match) and West Indian captain Viv Richards viewed such protection as cowardly. India captain Sunil Gavaskar believed that helmets slowed down a batsman's reflexes and refused to wear one. 
In more recent times, many batsmen have felt that modern helmet designs have become increasingly obstructive. Most notably, England captain Alastair Cook for a time refused to wear a new helmet complying with ICC safety regulations since he felt it was distracting and uncomfortable. His England teammate Jonathan Trott also refused for similar reasons, and teammate Nick Compton (a close friend of Phillip Hughes) felt that the new regulations were overzealous.

Cricket helmet manufacturers 
There are a number of cricket helmet manufacturers and brands available. Some of them are Gunn & Moore, Sanspareils Greenlands, and Sareen Sports Industries.

Many professional cricket players choose to wear the Masuri cricket helmet with the brand being worn by approximately 70% of players competing in the 2019 Cricket World Cup. Masuri are also the original inventors of the first neck protector, an additional piece of protective equipment that attaches to the back of the cricket helmet, when they launched their Stem Guard in 2015.

See also

 Batting helmet for Baseball or Softball

References

Cricket equipment
Helmets